The 2018 GP3 Series was the ninth and final season of the second-tier of Formula One feeder championship and also ninth and final season under the moniker of GP3 Series, a motor racing feeder series that runs in support of the 2018 FIA Formula One World Championship and sister series Formula 2. This was the final contested season of GP3, as the series united with the FIA Formula 3 European Championship to form the FIA Formula 3 Championship.

2018 was the final season that the Dallara GP3/16 chassis package—which débuted in the 2016 GP3 Series—was used in competition, as a brand new chassis package for the FIA Formula 3 Championship was introduced in 2019.

After finishing 3rd in the final feature race of the last season of GP3, Anthoine Hubert was crowned the 2018 GP3 Champion. ART successfully defended their teams' title over Trident after the first race at Sochi, winning the teams' title in eight of the nine seasons of GP3.

Runner-up Nikita Mazepin won 4 races; in Barcelona, Hungaroring, Spa-Francorchamps, and Yas Marina. After having four rounds with Jenzer Motorsport, David Beckmann moved to Trident before the summer break and took 3 race wins. Champion Anthoine Hubert, Callum Ilott, Leonardo Pulcini, and Pedro Piquet all won 2 races. Also, Giuliano Alesi won the second race in Spain, Jake Hughes won for the third time in the series at the Red Bull Ring, and Dorian Boccolacci, who drove for MP Motorsport before being promoted to their Formula 2 team won the sprint race at the Hungaroring.

Teams and drivers
All GP3 drivers competed in a Dallara GP3/16 chassis using a Mecachrome GP3 V6 engine and Pirelli P Zero and Cinturato tyres.

Team changes
 DAMS left the championship after two years of competition. Their entry was taken by Formula 2 team MP Motorsport.

Driver changes
 Gabriel Aubry and Joey Mawson, who raced in 2017 Eurocup Formula Renault 2.0 and 2017 FIA Formula 3 European Championship respectively, made their series début with Arden International. They were joined by Julien Falchero, who switched from Campos Racing. Steijn Schothorst left the team and switched to sports car racing, joining 2018 Blancpain GT Series.
 Dorian Boccolacci and Niko Kari moved from Trident and Arden International respectively to MP Motorsport. They were joined by 2017 Formula Renault Eurocup runner-up Will Palmer.
 Tatiana Calderón moved from DAMS to Jenzer Motorsport. She was joined by 2017 FIA Formula 3 European Championship driver David Beckmann. Arjun Maini left the team to join the FIA Formula 2 Championship.
 2017 FIA Formula 3 European Championship drivers Callum Ilott and Nikita Mazepin moved to the series, joining ART Grand Prix for the season. Under the series regulations, reigning GP3 Series champion George Russell could not compete in the championship again and left the series along with Jack Aitken and Nirei Fukuzumi and joined Formula 2. Fukuzumi will also contest the 2018 Super Formula Championship.
 Simo Laaksonen continued his collaboration with Campos Racing after his campaign with the team in the 2017 Euroformula Open Championship. He was partnered by Leonardo Pulcini and Diego Menchaca, who reignited their partnership with Campos after a season with Arden in 2017 and 2017 World Series Formula V8 3.5 respectively. Raoul Hyman and Marcos Siebert both left the team. Siebert later joined Campos in the 2018 Euroformula Open Championship.
 Alessio Lorandi, who raced with Jenzer Motorsport switched to race with Trident. He was joined by former FIA Formula 3 European Championship driver Pedro Piquet.

Midseason changes
 Formula Renault Eurocup race-winner Christian Lundgaard joined MP Motorsport for a one-off entry at Paul Ricard, replacing Will Palmer. Lundgaard was replaced by FIA Formula 3 European Championship driver Devlin DeFrancesco for the rest of the season. 
 Jannes Fittje replaced David Beckmann in Jenzer Motorsport after Beckmann parted ways with the team prior Hungaroring round. Beckmann filled Alessio Lorandi's slot in Trident, while Lorandi moved to Trident's FIA Formula 2 Championship team ahead of the Hungaroring round, replacing Santino Ferrucci.
 Richard Verschoor replaced Dorian Boccolacci for the Spa-Francorchamps round, as the French driver joined MP's FIA Formula 2 team, to replace Roberto Merhi. Niko Kari was also promoted to Formula 2 with MP Motorsport before the Sochi round. Jehan Daruvala took Kari's seat for the Abu Dhabi round.
 Sacha Fenestraz replaced Julien Falchero for Arden International ahead of the Sochi Autodrom round.

Calendar
The following nine rounds took place as part of the 2018 championship. Each round consisted of two races, a longer race 1 and a shorter race 2:

Calendar changes
 The championship will expand to nine rounds in 2018.
 The championship will return to the Sochi Autodrom, running in support of the Russian Grand Prix. The series last visited the circuit in 2015.
 The championship will make its début at the Circuit Paul Ricard, running in support of the French Grand Prix.
 The stand-alone event run at the Jerez Circuit in 2017 was discontinued.

Results

Season summary

Championship standings

Scoring system
Points were awarded to the top 10 classified finishers in the race 1, and to the top 8 classified finishers in the race 2. The pole-sitter in the race 1 also received four points, and two points were given to the driver who set the fastest lap inside the top ten in both the race 1 and race 2. No extra points were awarded to the pole-sitter in the race 2.

Race 1 points

Race 2 points
Points were awarded to the top 8 classified finishers.

Drivers' championship

Notes:
† — Drivers did not finish the race, but were classified as they completed over 90% of the race distance.

Teams' championship
Only three best-finishing cars are allowed to score points in the championship.

Notes:
† — Drivers did not finish the race, but were classified as they completed over 90% of the race distance.

Notes

References

External links
 

GP3 Series
GP3 Series seasons
GP3
GP3 Series